Thiaroye (or Tiaroye) is the name of a historic town in Sénégal, situated in the suburbs of Dakar, on the southeast coast of the Cap-Vert peninsula, between Pikine and Rufisque.

Since the administrative reform in 1996, Thiaroye has been divided into independent communes, Thiaroye-Gare, Thiaroye-sur-Mer and Thiaroye-Kao (or Djiddah Thiaroye Kao), with Guinaw-Rail Nord, Guinaw-Rail Sud (both to the west), and Tivaouane-Diacksao (to the east) split off and separating Thiaroye-sur-Mer from the other two inland communes.

History
The village of Thiaroye was founded sometime around 1800, and as the city of Dakar, created by the French, expanded in the 20th century, Thiaroye was slowly merged into the larger city.

Thiaroye is most known for, and its name has become emblematic of, a single incident in 1944: the Thiaroye Massacre by French forces. On 1 December 1944, at the barracks of Thiaroye, African soldiers clashed with the French state. The uprising involved nearly 1280 African ex-POWs in the first contingent to be repatriated from Europe in 1944. The event was defined as "mutinous" because the men were partially armed, uniformed and under military discipline. The cause of the soldiers' protest was the failure of the French authorities to provide them with back-pay and demobilization premiums. The event in Thiaroye sent shockwaves throughout French West Africa. The uprising reflected a change in attitude towards France. The African ex-POWs had acquired a heightened consciousness of themselves as Africans united by their shared experience in suffering.

Administration and politics
Thiaroye is the seat of Thiaroye Arrondissement in the Pikine Department (région de Dakar). The three communes are governed as a single entity, but retain some administrative independence.

Geography
Thiaroye-Gare, closest to Dakar, is bordered by Pikine (a city of almost one million people), Nimzat, Yeumbeul, Thiaroye Kao, Diaksaw and Darou Rahmane.  
Thiaroye-sur-Mer is bordered by Bel-Air, Hann-Montagne, Pikine, Guinaw-Rails, Tivaouane, Diammagueun, Mbaw Gou Ndaw and Gorée.
Thiaroye-Kao, border Yeumbeul, Boun and Darou Rahmane.

Population

As of 2002 the population of Thiaroye-Gare has grown to 21,873, Thiaroye-sur-Mer to 36,602, and that of Thiaroye-Kao to 90,586.

As of 2007 official estimates put the population of the three communes at 24,867, 41,612 and 102,985.

Economic activity 
Thiaroye continues to be integrated economically into Dakar, with much of the population commuting to the city center for work.

Thiaroye-Gare is named for the large train station on the line leading to Dakar, and continues to be a major transport center.  Goods and people travelling to and from Dakar must pass here, and it is one of the reasons neighboring Pikine was founded as a relocation camp in 1952.

Small scale industry, artisanal trades and commerce make up much of the rest of the economy, though unemployment remains high, as in other outer suburbs, which see regular immigration from rural areas.

Pollution 
One outgrowth of small scale industry in Thiaroye has been a high rate of pollution and pollution-related diseases. One recent form of income, the salvaging of automobile batteries for products including lead, has created a highly publicised wave of childhood illnesses.  In the past, local blacksmiths of the Thiaroye Sur Mer area had salvaged lead from car batteries to fashion into net weights for the nearby fishing industry.  In the mid-2000s, as the world price of lead increased, purchasing agents from India offered large payments for lead, leading locals to sift tailings from smithies' and breakers' yards for lead pellets, usually by hand. Lead poisoning of children born to workers, or those who were exposed to the lead dust created by sifting, climbed. As of the end of 2008, this pollution has been blamed for at least 18 deaths and hundreds of poisoning related illnesses, along with uncounted deaths of animals and human miscarriages.  A much publicised government cleanup campaign has, according to the World Health Organization, been ineffective, and plans are under study to move entire neighbourhoods in the town.

Market 
Thiaroye-Gare market is situated along the border with Pikine near the Thiaroye station, and is the largest produce market in the Dakar region, fed by suppliers from Nyayes, Cap-Vert, Casamance, and Keur Massar. The train line (the ) from Dakar stops at the very center of the market, making it easy for city residents to shop there, and avoiding the higher city prices.

Around the produce market have grown markets for general manufactures, one of the largest lumber markets in Dakar, and wholesale companies supplying markets in city center.  There are over 4500 formal traders, almost that many street sellers and a thousand or more wholesale shops surrounding the market. The lumber market has also drawn artisanal woodcarvers and an industry selling wood for barbeque cooking at festivals and family celebrations.

Institutions 

See also 
 Thiaroye Massacre
 Dakar
 Pikine

References

Bibliography 
 (German) Dirke Köpp, Untersuchungen zum Sprachgebrauch im Senegal : Mikrostudie im Drogenpräventionszentrum Centre de Sensibilisation and d'Informations sur les Drogues in Thiaroye (Dakar), 2002
  Myron Echenberg, « Tragedy at Thiaroye: The Senegalese Soldiers' Uprising of 1944 », in Peter Gutkind, Robin Cohen and Jean Copans (sous la direction de), African Labor History, Beverly Hills, 1978, p. 109-128 
  S. C. Faye, S. Faye, S. Wohnlich and C.B. Gaye, « An assessment of the risk associated with urban development in the Thiaroye area (Senegal) », Environmental Geology, 2004, vol. 45, section 3, p. 312-322  
  Boubacar Boris Diop, Thiaroye terre rouge, dans Le Temps de Tamango, L'Harmattan, 1981
  Jacques Weber, Les enquêtes socio-économiques au Centre de recherches océanographiques de Dakar-Thiaroye, Centre de recherches océanographiques de Dakar-Thiaroye, 1982
  Abdoul, M. The production of the city and urban informalities: the Borough of Thiaroye-sur-mer in the City of Pikine, Senegal. in Under Siege: Four African Cities - Freetown, Johannesburg, Kinshasa, Lagos. (O. Enwezor, C. Basualdo, U. M. Baueret eds) Ostfildern-Ruit, Hatje Cantz Publishers(2002). pp337–58

Filmography 
  Ousmane Sembène, Camp de Thiaroye, long métrage en couleurs, 1988, 147'
  Thiaroye sur Mer, entre l'océan and les industries, film documentaire, 1998, 13'

External links
  « Quitter Dakar » (reportage RFI à Thiaroye-sur-Mer, 28 mai 2006)
  Histoire de Thiaroye-Gare
   Présentation de la commune d'arrondissement de Djiddah Thiaroye Kao
  « 1er décembre 1944 : le massacre du camp de Thiaroye » (article de Hervé Mbouguen, 23 octobre 2003)
  Camp de Thiaroye (extrait vidéo sur le site de la Médiathèque des Trois Mondes)
  Website of the Centre de recherches océanographiques de Dakar-Thiaroye (CRODT).

Populated places in Dakar Region
Dakar
History of Senegal
French West Africa
Populated coastal places in Senegal